HD 224635 and HD 224636 is a pair of stars comprising a binary star system in the constellation Andromeda. They are located approximately 94 light years away and they orbit each other every 717 years.

The primary star is HD 224635, a magnitude 6.46 star (making it visible by the naked eye under very favourable conditions) with a spectral type F8 that is 1.19 times more massive than the Sun. 

The secondary star is the slightly fainter HD 224636, with an apparent visual magnitude of 6.72, a spectral type G1, and 1.13 times more massive than the Sun.

References

Andromeda (constellation)
224635
Double stars
9074
118281
Durchmusterung objects